Simko Shikak born 1887, was a Kurdish chieftain of the Shekak tribe. He was born into a prominent Kurdish feudal family based in Chihriq castle located near the Baranduz river in the Urmia region of northwestern Iran. By 1920, parts of Iranian Azerbaijan located west of Lake Urmia were under his control. He led Kurdish farmers into battle and defeated the Iranian army on several occasions. The Iranian government had him assassinated in 1930.<ref>M. M. Gunter, The Kurdish Question in Perspective, World Affairs, pp. 197-205, No.4, Vol. 166, Spring 2004. (see p.203)</ref> Simko took part in the massacre of the Assyrians of Khoy and instigated the massacre of 1,000 Assyrians in Salmas.

Family background
His family was one of the most prominent and politically active Kurdish families throughout Qajar reign from the late 18th to early 20th century. Sadiq Khan Shikak was one of the generals and governors in the Agha Muhammad Khan's early Qajar state and was commanding a force of 10,000 soldiers. However, he was soon fell out of favor and Qajar monarch attempted to murder him. Sadiq Khan has been accused of taking part in the assassination of Qajar king in the town of Shusha in 1797. Among other prominent members of the family are Ismail Khan The Great and his son Ali Khan, Muhammad Pasha son of Ali Khan, Cewer (Ja'afar) Agha brother of Simko. Many members of the family were murdered by the Qajar state such as Cewer (Dja'far) Agha'' who was killed at Tabriz by the order of governor general.

Political life
After the murder of Cewer Agha, Simko became the head of Shikak forces. In May 1914, he attended a meeting with Abdürrezzak Bedir Khan who at the time was a Kurdish politician supported by the Russians. The Iranian government was trying to assassinate him like the other members of his family. In 1919, Mukarram ul-Molk, the governor of Azerbaijan devised a plot to kill Simko by sending him a present with a bomb hidden in it.

Simko was also in contact with Kurdish revolutionaries such as Seyyed Taha Gilani (grandson of Sheikh Ubeydullah who had revolted against Iran in the 1880s). Seyyed Taha was a Kurdish nationalist who was conducting propaganda among the Iranian Kurds for the union of Iranian Kurdistan and Turkish Kurdistan in an independent state.

Jointly with the Ottoman Army he organized the massacre in Haftevan in February 1915 during which 700–800 Armenians and Assyrians were murdered.

Simko Shikak revolt

In March 1918, under the pretext of meeting for the purpose of cooperation, Simko arranged the assassination of the Assyrian Church of the East patriarch, Mar Shimun XIX Benyamin, ambushing him and his 150 guards, as Mar Shimun was entering his carriage. The patriarchal ring was stolen at this time and the body of the patriarch was only recovered hours later, according to the eye-witness account of Daniel d-Malik Ismael.

On March 16 after the murder of Mar Shimun, Assyrians under the command of Malik Khoshaba and Petros Elia of Baz attacked Simkos' fortress in Charah in which Simko was decisively defeated. The fortress of Charah had never been conquered previously despite attempts by Iranians and the river was red from the blood of dead Shikak fighters.  Simko was panic stricken during the battle and managed to escape, abandoning his men.

By summer 1918, Simko had established his authority in the region west of Lake Urmia.

At this time, government in Tehran tried to reach an agreement with Simko on the basis of limited Kurdish autonomy. Simko had organized a strong Kurdish army which was much stronger than Iranian government forces. Since the central government could not control his activities, he continued to expand the area under his control and by 1922, cities of Baneh and Sardasht were under his administration.

In the battle of sari Taj in 1922, Simko's forces could not resist the Iranian Army's onslaught in the region of Salmas and were finally defeated and the castle of Chari was occupied. The strength of the Iranian Army force dispatched against Simko was 10,000 soldiers.

Legacy
Simko's revolts are seen by some as an attempt by a powerful tribal chief to establish his personal authority over the central government throughout the region. Although elements of Kurdish nationalism were present in this movement, historians agree these were hardly articulate enough to justify a claim that recognition of Kurdish identity was a major issue in Simko's movement. It lacked any kind of administrative organization and Simko was primarily interested in plunder. Government forces and non-Kurds were not the only ones to suffer in the attacks, the Kurdish population was also robbed and assaulted. Simko's men do not appear to have felt any sense of unity or solidarity with fellow Kurds. In the words of Kurdologist and Iranologist Garnik Asatrian:  On the other hand, Reza Shah's military victory over Simko and Turkic tribal leaders initiated a repressive era toward non-Persian minorities. In a nationalistic perspective, Simko's revolt is described as an attempt to build a Kurdish tribal alliance in support of independence. According to Kamal Soleimani, Simko Shikak can be located "within the confines of Kurdish ethno-nationalism". According to the political scientist Hamid Ahmadi:

See also

Mar Shimun XIX Benyamin

References

External links
 72nd Anniversary of Simko, 2002 

People from Urmia
1887 births
1930 deaths
Assassinated Iranian Kurdish politicians
Kurdish rebels
Sayfo perpetrators